Cosmosoma contracta is a moth of the family Erebidae. It was described by Francis Walker in 1856. It is found in São Paulo, Brazil.

References

contracta
Moths described in 1856